Murray Jones may refer to:

 Murray Jones (footballer), English football forward, coach and manager
 Murray Jones (sailor), New Zealand sailor
 Murray Jones (rugby union), New Zealand rugby union player